South Waterhen Lake is an organized hamlet in Saskatchewan.

References

Organized hamlets in Saskatchewan
Meadow Lake No. 588, Saskatchewan
Division No. 17, Saskatchewan